Palmeiras-Barra Funda, also known only as Barra Funda, is a train station on CPTM Line 7-Ruby and ViaMobilidade Line 8-Diamond, in the district of Barra Funda in São Paulo.

History
The first railway to open a station in Barra Funda was the Estrada de Ferro Sorocabana, on 10 July 1875. On 19 May 1892, São Paulo Railway opened their station, a few meter ahead, after Viaduto Pacaembu. The stations were isolated from each other. The idea of integration between the suburban trains and Metro began in the 1980s.

The current station was built by the São Paulo Metro with resources from the State and Federal Governments, in the location of the old Estrada de Ferro Sorocabana station, to attend the East-West Line (current Line 3-Red) and unify in only one station the FEPASA and CBTU commuter trains. During the construction, in May 1986, a favela was displaced, which was located onder the adjacent Viaduto Antártica, paying Cz$ 6,000 for each family. Despite the amount paid, the families chose to invade a land in Alto da Lapa, which was considered the first municipal land invasion during Jânio Quadros administration.

The station was opened on 17 December 1988, only with Metro and FEPASA lines. CBTU line was transferred only on 5 January 1989.

After the unification of the FEPASA and CBTU commuter train line as CPTM, a free interchange between the old companies' lines began.

The same happened to the CPTM station in 2007.

Station layout

References

Companhia Paulista de Trens Metropolitanos stations
Railway stations opened in 1988